Alessandro Tripaldelli (born 9 February 1999) is an Italian professional footballer who plays as a left back for Serie B club SPAL.

Club career
He is a product of Juventus youth teams and started playing for their Under-19 squad in the 2017–18 season. He appeared for their Under-19 squad in the 2016–17 UEFA Youth League and 2017–18 UEFA Youth League.

On 30 January 2018, he was sold by Juventus to Sassuolo for 1.5 million euros and loaned back to Juventus for the remainder of the 2017–18 season.

On 31 August 2018, he joined Dutch club PEC Zwolle on a season-long loan. He made his Eredivisie debut for PEC Zwolle on 16 September 2018 in a game against Vitesse, as a starter.

On 10 January 2019, Tripaldelli joined Serie B side Crotone on loan.

On 28 September 2019, he played his first game in Serie A with Sassuolo.

On 17 September 2020, he joined Serie A side Cagliari.

On 15 August 2021, Tripaldelli joined SPAL on loan with an obligation to buy.

International career
Tripaldelli was first called up to represent his country in September 2014 for Italy national under-16 football team friendlies.

He was selected to the U17 squad for the 2016 UEFA European Under-17 Championship, in which Italy did not advance from the group stage.

He was the starter for the U19 squad at the 2018 UEFA European Under-19 Championship, where Italy finished as runners-up to Portugal.

Honours

International
Italy U19
UEFA European Under-19 Championship runner-up: 2018

Italy U20
FIFA U-20 World Cup fourth place: 2019

References

External links
 

1999 births
Footballers from Naples
Living people
Italian footballers
Italy youth international footballers
Italy under-21 international footballers
Association football defenders
PEC Zwolle players
F.C. Crotone players
U.S. Sassuolo Calcio players
Cagliari Calcio players
S.P.A.L. players
Eredivisie players
Serie A players
Serie B players
Italian expatriate footballers
Expatriate footballers in the Netherlands
Italian expatriate sportspeople in the Netherlands